Manokotak is a city in Dillingham Census Area, Alaska, United States. At the 2010 census the population was 442, up from 399 in 2000.

Geography
Manokotak is located at  (58.981087, -159.055808).

Demographics

Manokotak first appeared on the 1950 U.S. Census as an unincorporated village. It formally incorporated in 1970.

As of the Census' 2018 American Community Survey, there were 824 people and 152 households residing in the village. The population density was 11.3 people per square mile. There were 249 housing units with a median value of $70,000 per housing unit. The racial makeup of the city was about 70% native, 16% white, and 4% Asian.

There were 93 households, out of which 55.9% had children under the age of 18 living with them, 67.7% were married couples living together, 11.8% had a female householder with no husband present, and 17.2% were non-families. 15.1% of all households were made up of individuals, and none had someone living alone who was 65 years of age or older.  The average household size was 4.29 and the average family size was 4.92.

In the village the age distribution of the population shows 44.4% under the age of 18, 10.8% from 18 to 24, 24.8% from 25 to 44, 15.0% from 45 to 64, and 5.0% who were 65 years of age or older.  The median age was 22 years. For every 100 females, there were 116.8 males.  For every 100 females age 18 and over, there were 133.7 males.

The median income for a household in the village was $26,875, and the median income for a family was $30,357. Males had a median income of $13,125 versus $0 for females. The per capita income for the city was $9,294.  About 32.5% of families and 35.3% of the population were below the poverty line, including 44.0% of those under age 18 and none of those age 65 or over.

Notable people
Thomas O. Madole, Village Public Safety Officer (VPSO) that was murdered in the line of duty by Manokotak resident Leroy B. Dick, Jr. The murder of Officer Madole led to significant changes in Alaska's VPSO program, including the passage of legislation to allow VPSOs to carry firearms.
Don Page (born 1948), theoretical physicist, grew up in Manokotak where his parents taught elementary school

Education
The Manokotak "Nunaniq" School of the Southwest Region School District serves the village.

References

Cities in Alaska
Cities in Dillingham Census Area, Alaska